Col Alto is a historic home located at Lexington, Virginia.  The original section was built about 1827, and is a two-story, double-pile, three-bay, Georgian style brick dwelling with a hipped roof. In the 1930s, the house was remodeled, enlarged, and modernized by architect William Lawrence Bottomley.  Bottomley added the distinctive Palladian style veranda.  Also on the property are a contributing barn and log cabin.  Col Alto was the home of Congressman James McDowell (1795-1851), for whom the house was built, and Congressman Henry St. George Tucker III (1853-1932).

It was listed on the National Register of Historic Places in 1990. It is now operating as a Hampton Inn and Suites by Hilton.

References

Houses on the National Register of Historic Places in Virginia
Georgian architecture in Virginia
Houses completed in 1827
Houses in Lexington, Virginia
National Register of Historic Places in Lexington, Virginia
1827 establishments in Virginia
Tucker family residences